Jessey Wade (2 December 1859 – 1952) was an English suffragist and campaigner for animal welfare, known for founding the Cats Protection League (now known as Cats Protection). She co-founded a number of other animal welfare organisations and helped create and was editor of the feminist gender studies journal Urania.

Life and work 
Wade was friends with fellow animal welfare campaigner Ernest Bell and worked for him as a personal secretary until his death in 1933. As members of the Animals' Friend Society, Bell edited the journal The Animals' Friend and Wade became editor, after Edith Carrington, of its sister journal intended for children, The Little Animals' Friend. Wade published a number of pamphlets as part of the society's A. F. pamphlet series, including Cruelties in Dress, Mother Love in the Animal World, Fur Coats, Hats and the Woman, Little Father Christmas and Winter Cruelties.

Wade was Honorary Secretary of the Children’s Department for the Humanitarian League, from 1906 until 1919. In 1916, she co-founded Urania, a journal which formed part of a campaign to erase all distinctions based on gender.

In 1927, Wade was the organiser of a meeting in Caxton Hall, London, which established the Cats Protection League. She edited the Cats Protection League's journal, The Cats' Mews-Sheet. In the same year, Wade co-founded, with Ernest Bell and John Galsworthy, the League for the Prohibition of Cruel Sports and in 1932, the National Society for the Abolition of Cruel Sports. She was also a member of the Women's Freedom League, Pit Ponies' Protection Society, Performing and Captive Animals' Defence League.

In 1935, she gave a speech for the Humane Education Society in Manchester.

In 1948, she retired from editing The Little Animals' Friend, after having worked on it for 50 years.

Wade died in 1952, aged 92.

Contributions to animal organisations 

Wade founded and made significant contributions to a number of animal advocacy organisations:
 Humanitarian League (Honorary Secretary of the Children’s Department from 1906 until 1919)
 Pit Ponies' Protection Society (active member)
 Performing and Captive Animals' Defence League (co-founder with Ernest Bell and John Galsworthy)
 League for the Prohibition of Cruel Sports (now known as the League Against Cruel Sports; co-founder with Ernest Bell and John Galsworthy)
 National Society for the Abolition of Cruel Sports (co-founder with Ernest Bell and John Galsworthy)
 Cats Protection League (now known as Cats Protection; co-founder)
 Humane Education Society (Vice-President of the Council for Protection of Animals)

Publications

Pamphlets 
 Cruelties in Dress (London: Animals' Friend Society, 1912)
 Mother Love in the Animal World (London: Animals' Friend Society)
 Fur Coats (London: Animals' Friend Society)
 Hats and the Woman (London: Animals' Friend Society)
 Little Father Christmas (London: Animals' Friend Society)
 Winter Cruelties (London: Animals' Friend Society)

Books 
 The Animals' Friend Cat Book (London: G. Bell and Sons, 1917)

References 

1861 births
1952 deaths
British animal welfare workers
British vegetarianism activists
English feminists
English suffragists
Founders of charities
Organization founders
Women of the Victorian era